Donzdorf is a town in the district of Göppingen in Baden-Württemberg in southern Germany.

It is located 12 km east of Göppingen, and 13 km south of Schwäbisch Gmünd. The town is home to Nuclear Blast Records, one of the biggest heavy metal music record companies in Germany.

Geography

Donzdorf is located in the valley of the river Lauter, a tributary of the Fils river, 12 km east of Göppingen, on an elevation between 334 and 749 metres.

Subdivisions
Donzdorf includes the former independent communities of Reichenbach unter Rechberg and Winzingen. According to the borders that were decided on 31 December 1973 the municipality of Donzdorf consists of the city Donzdorf, the hamlets Berghof, Grünbach, Hagenbuch, Hochberg, Kuchalb and Unterweckerstell, the farms Messelhof, Oberweckerstell, Rindersteig, Scharfenhof, Schmelzofen and Vogelhof and the houses Hagenbucher Mühle, Hürbelsbach, Immenreute, Lautergarten and Steinernes Kreuz, as well as the abandoned village Klingenhof. The former municipality of Reichenbach unter Reichberg consists of the village Reichenbach unter Rechberg, the hamlets Aichhöfle and Birkhof, the farms Bäuerleshof, Böppeleshof, Bühlhof, Dangelhof, Feldhöfle, Haldenhof, Hasenhof, Ilgenhof, Kratzerhof, Lauxenhof, Schattenhof, Schillingshof, Stappenhof, Staudenhof, Striethof, Strietmühle, Täscherhof, Weberhäusle and Zirschberg, the castle Ramsberg and house Messenhalden as well as the abandoned village Zimmerhöfle. The former municipality Winzingen consists of the village Winzingen.

History

Up to the 18th century
The area around Donzdorf was already settled during Alemannic times which is proven by an old Alemanni cemetery discovered in 1964. There were over 100 graves from a time period between 600 and 700 AD.

In 1275 Donzdorf is first mentioned in the tax list of the diocese Konstanz. In that document the community is still called Tunesdorf. After the Staufer family went extinct a power struggle for Donzdorf erupted between the Counts of Helfenstein and the Lords of Rechberg which was eventually won by the Rechberg family. They ruled Donzdorf from the Scharfenschloss.

Donzdorf grew economically in the 15th century especially because of the high demand for Donzdorfer Sandstein (sandstone from Donzdorf). A lot of buildings in the area surrounding Donzdorf were built using this sandstone which had a particular high amount of iron and was therefore very resilient. It was also used to build parts of the Ulm Minster .

In 1478 the Lords of Rechberg built an administration building in the town and shortly afterwards began construction on the Gothic St. Martin's church. For this an altar was made by the famous Ulm artist Bartholomäus Zeitblom, the panels of which can be seen in the Würth collection in the Johanniterkirche Schwäbisch Hall.

In 1568 the Donzdorf castle was built in renaissance style. From this point on Donzdorf was only a side residence and was sold to the Duchy of Württemberg in 1735. In 1745 a Lady of Rechberg bought Donzdorf back and moved into the castle. Her son expanded the castle to make it his main residence and created the garden following the French design.

Around this time the people had fallen into poverty in the aftermath of the Spanish War of Succession. This was changed by Johann Benedikt Jehlin who built a smelting furnace that employed 80 people. However, the smelting furnace was soon shut down because it only had very small success and Jehlin went bankrupt. Nevertheless, the smelter has a historic value because it was one of the earliest industrial establishments in the Göppingen district.

19th and 20th century
Because of the mediatization of all imperial knightly goods in 1803 Donzdorf went to the Electorate of Bavaria. Through a contract from 1810 it went back to Württemberg, where it would stay.

Through new administrative divisions of Württemberg it was assigned to Geislingen. In the administrative reform during Nazi times on April 25, 1938 Donzdorf was put into the district of Göppingen. 1945 it became a part of the American Occupation Zone and thus a part of the newly-formed Württemberg-Baden which in 1952 became the present state of Baden-Württemberg.

On 1 January 1974 Reichenbach unter Rechberg was incorporated into Donzdorf, as was Winzingen on 1 January 1975.

On 1 May 1976 Donzdorf was awarded city rights after reaching the population limit of ten thousand because of the incorporation.

Change of population

Politics

Town council
The town council consists of a certain number of elected members with the mayor as chairman of the council. The town council of Donzdorf was last elected in the communal elections on 26 May 2019. It currently consists of 22 members. The results of the last election were as follows:

Town twinning
Donzdorf has a town partnership with the French Riorges and Neusalza-Spremberg in Saxony. In 2011 the establishment of a partnership with the Spanish city of Calasparra.

Economy and Infrastructure

Traffic
Donzdorf is connected to the national road network by the B466 and has a bypass since 2010.

In 1901 the Lautertalbahn gave Donzdorf a connection to the regional rail network. The rail network eventually shut down with public transport ending in 1980 and transportation of goods in 1995. Nowadays the former station is used as a café and ice cream shop.

On the nearby Messelberg the Donzdorf airport is located which is used for gliders, small motorized aircraft and paragliding.

Resident companies
The most important employers in Donzdorf are the Michael Hörauf Machine factory and Stahlbau Wendeler. Donzdorf is also the origin of Nuclear Blast, one of the biggest Heavy Metal record labels in the world.

Education
Donzdorf has primary schools in both Donzdorf and the former municipalities. Donzdorf also has a Gemeinschaftsschule and a Gymnasium.

In addition to that Donzdorf has a small observatory.

Sights

Buildings
 Donzdorf Castle, the old residential seat of the Lords of Rechberg which today acts as town hall. The house that stands where the first building of the castle used to stand nowadays houses a kindergarten and the volunteer fire brigade. Because the castle has been expanded and renovated several times there are parts built both in the Renaissance and the rococo style.
Ramsberg Castle, another former residence of the Rechberg family
Scharfenberg Castle, the original seat of the Lords of Rechberg, nowadays a ruin
Winzingen Castle, castle in Winzingen that a lot of local myths are about

The Park
Originally planned as a French garden for Donzdorf Castle by Maximilian von Rechberg, the park features a fountain and many bronze statues. It was redesigned at the beginning of the 19th century into an English garden, but this was never completely finished.

Natural sights
Simonsbachstausee, a dammed lake 
Lauter waterfall, 7 metres high
Messelstein, a notable rock formation on the side of the Messelberg

Notable residents

 Anton von Rechberg (1776-1837), Bavarian general and hofmeister
 Franz Anton Staudenmaier (1800-1856), a Catholic theologian
 Otto von Rechberg (1833-1918), nobleman of the kingdoms of Bavaria and Wurttemberg, 1899-1910 President of the Württemberg Chamber of lords
 Albrecht von Stotzingen (1864-1938), Baron and the deputy of the First Chamber of the State Baden
 Theodor Zeller (1900-1986), painter and graphic artist
 Gabriele Miller (1923-2010), born in the district Winzingen, Roman Catholic theologian
 Andreas Geiger (born 1969), film director
 Carolin Villforth (born 1981), PhD Astrophysicist. Expert in active galactic nuclei (AGN).

Honorary citizens
Otto Maier
Hermann Seimetz (born 1938), CDU politician and former member of the Landtag of Baden-Württemberg

References

Towns in Baden-Württemberg
Göppingen (district)